GoLite is an outdoor hiking and backpacking gear company that relaunched as an apparel manufacturer under new ownership in 2018. Humanitarian and environmental initiatives are a key part of the new ownership. As of 2018, GoLite has donated 14,000 uniforms to help health care workers in Uganda and Guatemala using company fabric resources. The new sustainable clothing collection is intended to combine outdoor performance and athletic functionality. GoLite is headquartered in Seattle, WA.

History 
In 1998 GoLite was founded by Kim and Demetri "Coup" Coupounas as an outdoor equipment and clothing manufacturer based in Boulder, Colorado. In August 1998, the company launched with 12 simple and innovative products for the ultralight backpacker, designed by outdoors adventurer and author Ray Jardine.

During 16 years of operations of the original corporation, GoLite positioned itself as an innovator in lightweight outdoor products with a focus on technical performance, simplicity, and sustainable business practices. GoLite was widely viewed as the spark and driving force behind the ultralight backpacking movement and the overall shift towards lighter gear from other outdoor manufacturers that occurred in the decade after GoLite was founded.

GoLite designed and manufactured light and ultra-light clothing, footwear, backpacks, tents, sleeping bags, hydration packs, and accessories. GoLite products were and are used for backpacking, hiking, thru-hiking, adventure racing, trail running, mountaineering, snowshoeing, cross-country skiing, adventure travel, and alpinism.  

In 2008, GoLite became one of the first Certified B Corporations in the world - and the first outdoor brand. In 2010, GoLite became one of a handful of global brands to release a sustainability report] rated at the A+ verification level by the Global Reporting Initiative.

In 2012, after achieving success with a growing e-commerce business, GoLite switched to a direct-to-consumer model, rapidly opening storefronts and continuing  holiday warehouse sales across the country.

At one time, GoLite outdoor products were sold in retail shops in 23 countries and in over 20 wholly owned retail stores in the United States.  However, in October 2014, GoLite filed for Chapter 11 bankruptcy reorganization.

In 2018, Outside Online interviewed a former employee, Andrew Skurka, concerning the demise of the original company.  The article reported that the GoLite's 2014 bankruptcy stemmed from its overextension into athletic and lifestyle apparel to provide inventory for its brick-and-mortar stores. Skurka stated that “One mistake of the original GoLite was changing their identity every year or two” By 2014, the company had tied up too much cash in lifestyle apparel it couldn’t sell and moved to dissolve the business.

Current operations
In May 2018, GoLite relaunched under new ownership. Today the company no longer manufactures outdoor camping and backpacking products, but instead produces sustainable athletic and lifestyle apparel.

References

External links
 GoLite Website

Manufacturing companies based in Boulder, Colorado
Clothing companies established in 1998
Sporting goods manufacturers of the United States
Companies that filed for Chapter 11 bankruptcy in 2014